The Kingsway Shopping Centre is an under-cover shopping centre in Newport city centre, Wales. The northern pedestrian entrance is on John Frost Square adjoining the Friars Walk shopping and leisure complex. The east pedestrian entrance is off Commercial Street. The west pedestrian entrance is on Emlyn Street. The centre is a short walk from the high street shops of Commercial Street and High Street. Newport railway station is also a short walk away.

The Kingsway car park on Emlyn Street has over 1000 spaces and the adjacent Friars Walk car park holds 350 cars, both accessed from the A4042 Kingsway.

Kingsway Centre includes a range of high street chain and indenendent privately owned shops. It is adjoining Newport Museum, Art Gallery and Central Library and it is close to Newport bus station. Kingsway Centre underwent a refurbishment and extension during 2007 and 2008.

In October 2014 the centre was bought by Bywater Properties and Queensberry Real Estate, the developers of Friars Walk.

Stores
As of January 2022, retailers include:
 Sainsbury's Local
 Starbucks
 NM Money
 Kutchenhaus
 The Outlet
 Euro Gallery
 DWP Job Centre
 F. Hinds
 Warren James
 Boswells Cafe
 Castle Farm Shop
 Top Gift
 Bubble Trouble
 Claire's
 Select
 Shoe Zone
 Bodycare
 Bonmarche
 Luv2Giv
 Savers
 B&M Bargains
 Newport County club shop
 Danielle's Fabrics
 Glamour Forever
 Lyssium Aromatics
 Eazability
 Poundland
 Wilko

References

Shopping in Newport, Wales